Poliopastea nigritarsia is a moth of the family Erebidae. It was described by George Hampson in 1898. It is found in Mexico, Guatemala and Trinidad.

References

 

Poliopastea
Moths described in 1898